Dorrit Kristensen (born 21 March 1938) is a Danish former swimmer. She competed in the women's 200 metre breaststroke at the 1960 Summer Olympics.

References

External links
 

1938 births
Living people
Danish female breaststroke swimmers
Olympic swimmers of Denmark
Swimmers at the 1960 Summer Olympics
People from Silkeborg
Sportspeople from the Central Denmark Region